The 1925–26 international cricket season was from September 1925 to April 1926. There were no any major tournament held during this period.

Season overview

December

New Zealand in Australia

February

Bombay in Ceylon

March

MCC in the West Indies

References

International cricket competitions by season
1925 in cricket
1926 in cricket